The Great Northern H-5 was a class of 25 4-6-2 "Pacific" type steam locomotives that were originally built as E-14 4-6-0 "Ten Wheelers" by the Baldwin Locomotive Works in 1909 and operated by the Great Northern Railway until the mid 1950s.

The locomotives hauled passenger trains on the Great Northern mainline, such as the Empire Builder and the Oriental Limited.

Today, only one H-5 survives, No. 1355. It was retired in July 1955 and moved to the Milwaukee Road shops in Sioux City, Iowa where it still resides today.

History
The class was originally built in 1909 as E-14 "Ten Wheelers", then, between October 6, 1921 and July 8, 1928, they have been rebuilt into H-5 "Pacifics" and hauled mainly passenger trains such as the Empire Builder and the Oriental Limited. The first ten were numbered 1486–1495, then renumbered 1350–1359. They were also converted from coal to oil and some were fitted with boosters that added  of tractive effort. Later in their service life, they were reassigned to freight service, such as hauling iron ore on the Mesabi Range. As the railroad made a transition to diesel power, retirement started on September 13, 1950 and by August 25, 1955, all the H-5s have been retired.

1941 Accident 
 On July 24, 1941, H-5 1351 was pulling a passenger train toward Vancouver, British Columbia, when it collided head-on with Canadian National S-1-b 2-8-2 3254 at North Road cut near Burnaby. The accident caused the locomotive’s smokebox to be torn off, the locomotive’s frame to be cracked, and the rear of the locomotive itself to be pressed against its tender. As a result of this, 1351 became the very first H-5 to be retired, and it was scrapped in October of that year after being deemed damaged beyond economical repair.

Preservation
Only one H-5 has been preserved, No. 1355. It was retired in July 1955 and put on display at the Milwaukee Road shops in Sioux City, Iowa, where it still resides today. It was also added to the National Register of Historic Places in 2004 as Great Northern Railway Steam Locomotive No. 1355 and Tender 1451. Furthermore, it is the sole surviving Great Northern "Pacific" type steam locomotive.

Roster

References

Great Northern Railway (U.S.)
Railway locomotives introduced in 1909
Railway locomotives introduced in 1921
Railway locomotives on the National Register of Historic Places
4-6-2 locomotives
Baldwin locomotives
Passenger locomotives
H-5
National Register of Historic Places in Sioux City, Iowa
Woodbury County, Iowa
Rail transportation on the National Register of Historic Places in Iowa
Preserved steam locomotives of Iowa